Clemenceau is a hamlet in the Canadian province of Saskatchewan named after Georges Clemenceau, the French physician, journalist and statesman.

Clemenceau is located on the Canadian National Railway approximately 27 kilometres (17 miles) south of Hudson Bay, Saskatchewan and by 1929 the town was one of the largest shipping points of railcar lots of lumber in the province.   The lumber industry was the key industry of the town, but a forest fire in 1942 seriously damaged forestry in the area.  In 1950, Clemenceau was one of nine provincial land settlement projects after World War II, and was primarily a resettlement block for farmers.

As of 2011, a Federal grain elevator in Clemenceau still stands adjacent to the railway.

Demographics 

References 

Designated places in Saskatchewan
Hamlets in Saskatchewan
Hudson Bay No. 394, Saskatchewan